The 1937 Texas Mines Miners football team was an American football team that represented Texas School of Mines (now known as University of Texas at El Paso) as a member of the Border Conference during the 1937 college football season. In its ninth season under head coach Mack Saxon, the team compiled a 7–1–2 record (2–1–1 against Border Conference opponents), finished fourth in the conference, and outscored opponents by a total of 215 to 91.

Quarterback Ken Heineman set two school records (since surpassed) with 407 yards of total offense and 296 all-purpose yards in a game against Arizona State-Flagstaff. At the end of the season, Heineman was named to the Little All-America teams selected by NEA and Collyer's.  He was also selected as a first-team player on the All-Border Conference football team.

Schedule

References

Texas Mines
UTEP Miners football seasons
Texas Mines Miners football